Molly Kelly (née Craig, died January 2004) was an Australian Martu Aboriginal woman, known for her escape from the Moore River Native Settlement in 1931 and subsequent  trek home with her half-sister Daisy Kadibil (née Burungu) and cousin Gracie Cross (née Fields). She was a member of the Stolen Generations, which were part-white, part-Aboriginal children forcibly removed from their families by the Australian government. Her story was the inspiration for the book Follow the Rabbit-Proof Fence and the film Rabbit-Proof Fence.

Early life
Molly Craig was born in Jigalong, Western Australia, circa 1916/1917. Her mother, Maude, was a Martu Aboriginal woman, and her father was Thomas Craig, a white Australian fence inspector. The Martu people (Mardudjara) had moved from the nearby Sandy Desert. Jigalong was established in the far north west of Australia in 1907, as the location for a maintenance and rations store for workmen constructing the rabbit-proof fence. The rabbit-proof fence is a pest-exclusion fence constructed between 1901 and 1907 to keep rabbits and other agricultural pests, from the east, out of Western Australian pastoral areas.

In the first part of the 20th century, children of mixed Indigenous and white parentage were frequently removed from their families and placed in institutions or with white families as domestic servants.

The next day, the three girls escaped on foot, and walked to find the rabbit-proof fence and then follow it north back to Jigalong. Craig 'piggy-backed' the younger girls in turn. The journey was described in the book Follow the Rabbit-Proof Fence by Molly's daughter Doris Pilkington Garimara. In 2002, the book was made into a film, Rabbit-Proof Fence, directed by Phillip Noyce.

Later life 
Craig married Toby Kelly, an Aboriginal stockman, and the couple worked on Balfour Downs station. She gave birth to her first daughter, Nugi Garimara (Doris), in 1936 under a wintamarra (mulga) tree. In 1937, her second daughter Annabelle was born.

Molly Kelly was taken to the Moore River settlement again in 1940 with her daughters. She ran away in 1941, carrying 18-month-old Annabelle. She left Doris (4) with a relative. In 1943, Annabelle (Anna Wyld) was taken away from Kelly and told she was an orphan. She would never see her mother again, although they were able to exchange gifts before Kelly's death.

Doris was reunited with her mother 21 years later which led to her internationally acclaimed and award-winning trilogy, Caprice, A Stockman's Daughter, (UQP, 1991), Follow the Rabbit-Proof Fence, (UQP, 1996), and Under the Wintamarra Tree, (UQP, 2002). The children's edition of Follow the Rabbit-Proof Fence was Home to Mother, (UQP, 2006).

Kelly died in her sleep in January 2004, at Jigalong, Western Australia, at about 86–87 years old.

See also 

 Martu people
 Doris Pilkington Garimara
 Daisy Kadibil

Bibliography 

 Caprice, A Stockman's Daughter, (UQP, 1991) 
 Follow the Rabbit-Proof Fence, (UQP, 1996) 
 Under the Wintamarra Tree, (UQP, 2002) 
 Home to Mother, (UQP, 2006)

References

2004 deaths
Indigenous Australians from Western Australia